The Exchange Coffee House (1809-1818) was a hotel, coffeehouse, and place of business in Boston, Massachusetts, in the early 19th century. Designed by architect Asher Benjamin, it was located at Congress Square on Congress Street, and in its day it was the largest building in Boston and one of the tallest buildings in the northeastern United States. Andrew Dexter Jr. financed the project.  Dexter resorted to financial fraud to see the construction to completion, and fled to Nova Scotia to escape prosecution and his creditors.

The completed building passed to a succession of owners, who attempted to run it profitably, including Gilbert & Dean.

The Exchange Coffee House burned down in November 1818. Its owners and financial backers lost most of their investment, amounting to hundreds of thousands of dollars.

Events
 1809 - Fencing demonstration by Tromelle & Girard.
 1810
 June 26: Two notable Boston musicians of the time, François Mallet and Gottlieb Graupner, presented a concert at the Exchange Coffee House featuring “all the Musicians of the town.”
 December: Mr. Rannie, ventriloquist.
 1815 - Exhibit of the "panorama of the Battle of Leipsic."
 1817 - Sculpture exhibit assembled by "Petre Alessandri, sculptor, lately arrived from Italy."
 1818
 February 27: A group of the Boston Associates (including Patrick Tracy Jackson and Daniel Pinckney Parker) met at the Exchange Coffee House to discuss organizing the Suffolk Bank, a clearinghouse bank which had been granted its corporate charter by the 38th Massachusetts General Court on February 10. The bank's directors continued meeting periodically at the Coffee House until March 19, when they began renting offices on State Street.

References

Further reading

  
 
 

Commercial buildings completed in 1809
Burned buildings and structures in the United States
Former buildings and structures in Boston
1809 establishments in Massachusetts
1818 disestablishments
19th century in Boston
Financial District, Boston